Bélier is the designation of a single-stage French sounding rocket. Three versions of the Bélier were launched between 1961 and 1970 at the CIEES launch facility at Hammaguir, the Salto di Quirra and Ile de Levant missile ranges, and Kourou Space Center. After its retirement, the Bélier was used as an upper stage of other French sounding rockets, including the Dragon.

Belier I 
pay load: 30 kg 
maximum height: 80 km 
takeoff thrust: 20,00 kN 
takeoff weight: 313 kg 
diameter: 0.31 m 
length: 4.01 m 
fin span: 0.78 m

Belier II
pay load: 30 kg 
maximum height: 130 km 
takeoff thrust: 21.50 kN 
takeoff weight: 352 kg
diameter: 0,31 m 
length: 5,90 m 
fin span: 0,78 m

External links
https://web.archive.org/web/20080916173609/http://www.astronautix.com/lvs/belier.htm

Rockets and missiles